Javier Garza is an American sound engineer and mixer from Florida. Garza has done production work on a large number of successful major-label albums since 1990, and has won two Grammy Awards and nine Latin Grammy Awards. Among the artists whose music Garza has mixed are Gloria Estefan, Ricky Martin, Madonna, Thalía, Shakira, Carlos Vives, Marc Anthony, Vic Damone, Jennifer Lopez, Jon Secada, Alejandro Sanz, Jaci Velasquez, Paulina Rubio and Los Claxons

Grammy Awards
All of Garza's credits are for Mix Engineering. He's currently at the second spot as  Most Latin Grammys won by an Engineer or Mixer

2000 - Best Traditional Tropical Latin Album: Gloria Estefan, Alma Caribeña
2001 - Best Traditional Tropical Latin Album: Carlos Vives, Dejame Entrar
2001 - Latin Grammy, Best Engineered Album: Thalía, Arrasando
2002 - Latin Grammy, Best Contemporary Tropical Album: Carlos Vives, Fruta Fresca
2005 - Latin Grammy, Best Male Pop Performance: Obie Bermúdez, Todo el Año
2005 - Latin Grammy, Best Contemporary Tropical Album: Carlos Vives, Rock de Mi Pueblo
2006 - Latin Grammy, Best Tropical Regional  Mexican Album: A.B. Quintanilla III y los Kumbia Kings, Kumbia Kings Live
2007 - Latin Grammy, Best Contemporary Tropical Album: Oscar De Leon, Fuzionando
2009 - Latin Grammy, Best Children Album: Various Artists, Pombo Musical
2013 - Latin Grammy, Best Contemporary Pop Vocal Album: Alejandro Sanz, La Musica No Se Toca
2013 - Latin Grammy, Best Engineered Album: Kany Garcia, Kany Garcia
2014 - Latin Grammy, Best Contemporary Tropical Album: Carlos Vives, Mas + Corazon Profundo

External links
Official Website
[ Production Credits], Allmusic.com
Javier Garza at Discogs

American audio engineers
Record producers from Florida
Grammy Award winners
Latin Grammy Award winners
Living people
Latin music record producers
Year of birth missing (living people)